The Coordination Committee of Maoist Parties and Organizations of South Asia (CCOMPOSA)  is an umbrella organization of various South Asian Maoist parties and movements and its purpose is to coordinate their activities throughout South Asia (as well as elsewhere as needed).

Founding parties 
CCOMPOSA was founded in 2001 by the following parties:

Bangladesh
 Purba Bangala Sarbahara Party (Central Committee)
 Purba Bangla Sarbahara Party (Maobadi Punargathan Kendra)
 Bangladesher Samyabadi Dal (Marksbadi-Leninbadi)
 Purba Banglar Communist Party - Marksbadi-Leninbadi (Lal Patakar)
 Purba Banglar Sarbahara Party (Maoist Bolshevik Reorganization Movement) (observer status)

Bhutan
 Bhutan Communist Party (Marxist–Leninist–Maoist) (observer status)

India
 Communist Party of India (Marxist–Leninist) Naxalbari
 Maoist Communist Centre of India
 Revolutionary Communist Centre of India (Marxist–Leninist–Maoist)
 Revolutionary Communist Centre of India (Maoist)
 Communist Party of India (Marxist–Leninist) People's War
Note: Revolutionary Communist Centre of India (Maoist) and Maoist Communist Centre merged in 2003 and became Maoist Communist Centre of India. 
In 2004 Maoist Communist Centre of India and Communist Party of India (Marxist–Leninist) People's War merged to become Communist Party of India (Maoist))

Nepal
 Communist Party of Nepal (Maoist)

Sri Lanka
 Ceylon Communist Party (Maoist)

Declaration
At CCOMPOSA's second annual conference in 2002, a declaration was issued, outlining the vision CCOMPOSA had for its role in revolutionary politics, how it would operate, and how the political situation in South Asia and the world looked from their point of view.  It was declared that the organization would follow the ideas carved by Karl Marx, Vladimir Lenin and Mao Zedong, and, not least, to build on the examples and experience of Protracted People's Wars in Peru, Nepal, Philippines, India, Turkey and elsewhere.

Fourth Conference 
In August 2006, CCOMPOSA held its fourth conference in Nepal. Representatives of eight parties attended, including those of the Ceylon Communist Party (Maoist), who did not sign the resolutions. That has been taken as an indication that the CCP(M) was invited as an observer. The parties that participated in the conference were the following: Purba Bangala Sarbahara Party (Central Committee), Purba Banglar Communist Party - ML (Lal Patakar), Bangladesher Samyabadi Dal (ML) (all from Bangladesh), Communist Party of Bhutan (MLM), Communist Party of Nepal (Maoist), Communist Party of India (Maoist), Communist Party of India (ML) Naxalbari and Communist Party of India (MLM).
The conference resolved that coordination would be deepened and extended, while asserting that Nepali Maoists would not meddle in the 'Indian People's War'.

See also
Many parties of CCOMPOSA were members of the Revolutionary Internationalist Movement prior to its dissolution.

References

External links
 CCOMPOSA statements and documents

 
Communist parties in Asia
Anti-revisionist internationals
Organizations established in 2001